Tonina is an Italian feminine given name that is a diminutive form of Antonia and the feminine form of Tonino that is used in Italy. Notable people with this name include the following:

People
Tonina Jackson, primary ring name for Héctor Garza Lozano Vela (1917 – 1969), Mexican actor and professional wrestler also known as Héctor Lozano, Gordo Lozano and Pancho Morales
Tonina Torrielli (born 1934), Italian singer

See also

Tonia (name)
Tonin (name)
Tonita (name)

Notes

Italian feminine given names